Amogh or Amogha may refer to:

 Amogh Sunil Desai (born 1992), Indian cricketer
 Amoghabhuti or Amogh, king of the Kuninda Kingdom in the late 2nd century BC
 Amogh carbine, a select-fire personal defense weapon
 Amogha missile, a guided anti-tank missile

See also
 Amoghapasa inscription, Indonesian inscription
 Amoghasiddhi, an avatar of the Buddha
 Amoghavajra (705–774), Buddhist translator
 Amoghavarsha (disambiguation)